Bisphenol Z is an organic compound with the formula (HOC6H4)2C(CH2)5. This white, water-insoluble solid is classified as a bisphenol. It is a precursor to specialty polycarbonate plastics.

References

2,2-Bis(4-hydroxyphenyl)propanes